The Curtiss Candy Company was founded in 1916 by Otto Schnering near Chicago, Illinois. Wanting a more "American-sounding" name (due to anti-German sentiment during  World War I), Schnering named his company using his mother's maiden name.

Their first confectionery item was Kandy Kake, later refashioned in 1920 as the log-shaped Baby Ruth. Their second confectionery item was the chocolate-covered peanut butter crunch Butterfinger, which was introduced in 1926. In 1931, Curtiss marketed the brand by sponsoring famous air racer, John H. Livingston, in the Baby Ruth Aerobatic Team flying the air-racer Howard "Mike" at airshows, and sponsoring Livingston's Monocoupe racer in the 1934 MacRobertson Air Race. The Jolly Jack candy was included in army rations during World War II.

In 1964, Standard Brands purchased Curtiss Candy Company. Standard Brands merged with Nabisco in 1981. In 1990, RJR Nabisco sold the Curtiss brands to Nestlé.

The Baby Ruth / Butterfinger factory, built in the 1960s, is located at 3401 Mt. Prospect Rd. in Franklin Park, Illinois. Interstate 294 curves eastward around the plant, where a prominent, rotating sign, resembling a gigantic candy bar, is seen. It originally read "Curtiss Baby Ruth" on one side and "Curtiss Butterfinger" on the other. It was changed to read "Nestlé" following the acquisition.

A "Curtiss Baby Ruth" sign was on an apartment building across from Wrigley Field for several decades. Wrigley and the Curtiss plant are both on Addison Street, although more than 10 miles apart.

Curtiss products over the years

In the early decades, Curtiss had a wide variety of candies aside from Baby Ruth and Butterfinger.

Candies

Baby Ruth suckers
Baby Ruth (1921-1981)
Butterfinger (1923-1964)
Better Creams
Curtiss Butterscotch
Buy Golly
Buy Jiminy
Caramel Nougat
Caramel Smackers
Cherry Pattie
Chocolate Almond Nougat
Chocolate Dipper Mallows
Chocolate Dipped Nut Butter Pillows
Chocolate suckers
Coconut Grove
Curtiss Nut Roll
Dip
Easy Aces
Foxxy
Gypsy
Jolly Jack
Kandy Kake
Koko Nut Roll
Man-O-War
Milk Nut Loaf
Moon Spoon
Nickaloaf
Penny Log
Peppermint Patty
Royal Marshmallows
Safe-T-Pops
Taffee Giraffee
Topper
Wild Cherry suckers

Bite-sized candies
Butterfinger Chips
Caramel Nougats
Coconut Niblets
Dip-Bits*
Milk Caramels
Mint Patties
Nuggets

Drop and mint flavors

Assorted Fruit
Butterscotch
Chocolate
Grape
Lemon
Lime
Orange
Peppermint
Root Beer
Spearmint
Wild Cherry
Wintergreen

Gum flavors
Baby Ruth Peppermint 
Baby Ruth Fruit flavored
Bubble Chum
Hawaiian Fruit
Peppermint
Pepsin
Spearmint

Miracle-Aid flavors
(This was a competitor to Kool-Aid)
Cherry
Grape
Lemon Lime
Orange
Raspberry
Strawberry

References

Further reading 
 The Great American Candy Bar Book

Food and drink companies established in 1916
Food and drink companies disestablished in 1990
Defunct companies based in Illinois
Confectionery companies of the United States
1916 establishments in Illinois
1990 disestablishments in Illinois
Franklin Park, Illinois
1990 mergers and acquisitions